Liam Doran (born 22 March 1987) is a British professional rallycross driver competing in the FIA World Rallycross Championship, Global RallyCross Championship, X Games, and European Rallycross Championship. He is the son of British rallycross driver and Lydden Hill Race Circuit owner Pat Doran. In his early life he attended Fulston Manor School in Sittingbourne.
 
Having signed with Monster Energy in 2011 he has gone on to achieve an X Games Gold medal and numerous other accomplishments in various disciplines.

Racing career

2000
Doran started his career at the age of 14 choosing to follow in his fathers footsteps. In 2000 he competed in a junior Mini in the sport of rallycross. Doran progressed through the stages rapidly and continued in rallycross, driving a Citroën Saxo stockhatch and then a rear-wheel drive Ford Fiesta in 2007.

2009
In 2009 Doran ran among the quickest drivers in Europe in a Ford Fiesta ST Supercar and beat them, managing in the process to come second in the MSA British Rallycross Championship.

2010
Doran secured a drive with 14-times European Rallycross Champion Kenneth Hansen driving with the Citroën Total Rallycross Team in a Citroën C4. He managed to get to grips with the new Citroën very quickly and soon managed to get some outstanding results, being the driver to score the most points in the second half of the season, all this taking into consideration it was his first year at European level.

2011
In 2011 Doran had built up a reputation within the rallycross industry and resulting from this managed to sign with Monster Energy.
The newly formed Monster Energy Citroën Rallycross Team opened new doors of opportunity for Doran.

Doran was invited to participate in X Games 17 and went in as the underdog to drivers such as Tanner Foust, Ken Block and Travis Pastrana. The X Games Rally final saw Doran go head-to-head with Marcus Grönholm, where he beat the former WRC Champion to win the Gold Medal.

From his US success an opportunity arose to compete in the Lucas Oil Off Road Racing Series (LOORRS). Following an impressive performance in his first race he was offered the opportunity to drive in the series for 2012.

2012
With continued support from Monster Energy, Doran managed to achieve a second position in the 2012 European Rallycross Championship, concluding the season with a victory in Germany.

2013
With another full calendar scheduled and a new European rallycross team mate in 21-year-old Norwegian, Andreas Bakkerud, LD Motorsports was one of the strongest teams in the 2013 season.

This was Doran's most successful year winning 3 XGames medals. Doran won a gold and silver at XGAMES Munich and a bronze at XGAMES Los Angeles.

2014
For 2014 Doran raced a Citroën DS3 Supercar in the FIA World Rallycross Championship. He contested the first 6 rounds and the final round of the season, finishing in 25th overall with 17 points. For the other 5 rounds he was later suspended from racing by his native autosport authority MSA because of his bad behavior against some track marshalls during the home ERX round at Lydden Hill when his father's Ford RS200 caught fire. He made the finals stage once, in Sweden, and finished fifth.

2015
For 2015, Doran continued in the World Rallycross Championship, this time combining with reigning World Champion Petter Solberg to create the SDRX team. He raced in all rounds excluding Germany where his car failed scrutineering. He scored points at seven events and failed to reach the final, finishing 16th in the standings on 35 points - 266 points behind his championship winning team-mate.

2016
Doran signed for JRM Racing in 2016, contesting the WRX season with a Mini Countryman. Despite the car still being in its development phase, Doran took a shock win in his Semi-Final at the 2016 World RX of Hockenheim - having made the Semis in the previous race in Portugal. He failed to score in three of the next four events, before he was fired following a drunken altercation at Gatebil prior to the Canadian round.

2017

Following his Gatebil incident, the governing body of motorsport in the United Kingdom suspended Doran's racing license for 12 months, preventing his participation in the 2017 season.

2019

Returning for 2019, finished 3rd at the Yas Marina Circuit, in the opening round.

Racing record

Complete FIA European Rallycross Championship results

Division 1

Supercar

Complete Global RallyCross Championship results

Supercar

Complete FIA World Rallycross Championship results

Supercar

a Loss of 15 championship points – stewards' decision

References

External links

1987 births
Living people
British racing drivers
European Rallycross Championship drivers
World Rallycross Championship drivers
Global RallyCross Championship drivers
X Games athletes